Edith Miller may refer to:

 Edith Starr Miller (1887–1933), socialite, author, conspiracy theorist, and anti-Mormon agitator
 Edith Jane Miller (1875–1936), concert contralto singer